Marta Esteban Poveda (born 6 November 1982) is a Spanish long distance runner. She competed in the women's marathon at the 2017 World Championships in Athletics.

Achievements

References

External links

1982 births
Living people
Spanish female long-distance runners
Spanish female marathon runners
World Athletics Championships athletes for Spain
Place of birth missing (living people)
21st-century Spanish women